Henry Porter (born ca. 1636) was an English politician who sat in the House of Commons  in 1659.

Porter was the eldest son of Henry Porter of Lancaster.  In 1659, he was elected Member of Parliament for Lancaster in the Third Protectorate Parliament.

Porter was given as aged 29 in 1665.

References

1636 births
Year of death missing
English MPs 1659
People from Lancaster, Lancashire